Crouy-en-Thelle is a commune in the Oise department in northern France.

Population
As of 2017, Crouy-en-Thelle had a population of 1,098, with a population density of 187 per km². As of 2019, there are 415 dwellings in the commune, of which 399 primary residences.

Geography

The town is 3 km east of  Neuilly-en-Thelle, and 8 km northeast of Persan.

See also
Communes of the Oise department

References

Communes of Oise